Solitaire Meissmer was a three-year-old child who died in the 2004 Indian Ocean tsunami in Thailand. She became a subject of news coverage in December 2005, when her parents launched a search in the believe that she might still be alive, despite her body having been earlier identified by DNA testing.

At just under four years of age, Solitaire Meissmer went missing on 26 December 2004 during the 2004 Indian Ocean earthquake; the resulting tsunami having swept her away from her mother's arms.  Her parents, German Sascha Meissmer and his Thai wife Patchara, received a body on 8 August 2005 which was positively identified by the Thai Tsunami Victim Identification Unit in July and took it for cremation in Loei.  However, on 10 December 2005 they announced their wishes to search for their daughter after seeing a photograph on memorial website PhuketRemembers.com.

The image shows a young Eurasian girl in profile that they believed was their daughter. The picture is not in a particularly high resolution and offers very little evidence as to the true identity of the girl.  The photograph was taken at the Phuket Administration Organization (OrBorJor) office in Phuket the day after the tsunami, some 60 miles from the area she went missing.  Some of the other people in the photograph were contacted, but none remembered the girl well enough to give any help towards the search.

In addition to the photograph, several eyewitnesses had reported the girl alive during the week after the tsunami.

On 1 April 2006, it was reported on the homepage created for the child that a new and independent DNA analysis confirmed the result of the identification made the previous year.

During the intensified search which followed the discovery of the photo, a composite image was released which depicted five known photos of Solitaire and the alleged photo.

See also
Baby 81 incident

References
Aglionby, John (10 December 2005) "A year after the tsunami, couple believe image shows missing girl is alive" at The Guardian.  Retrieved 10 December 2005.
Tang, Alisa (14 December 2005) "Body handed over, but search goes on" at The Age (AP).  Retrieved 5 January 2006.
The Phuket Gazette Co Ltd. (12 December 2005) "Parents still hope to find daughter alive" at Phuket Gazette. Retrieved 16 December 2005.

Victims of the 2004 Indian Ocean earthquake and tsunami